Reti Medievali Rivista is an online-only open-access double-blind peer-reviewed academic journal, published twice a year, devoted to the study of the European Middle Ages. The journal was founded in 2000. It is listed in the Directory of Open Access Journals, and has an H Index of 5. It has been classed as an A-class journal by the Italian National Agency for the Evaluation of Universities and Research Institutes.

References

External links 
 http://www.rmojs.unina.it/index.php/rm/

Open access journals
History journals
2000 establishments in Italy